Joo Seng  is a subzone located in Toa Payoh in the Central Region of Singapore. It gets its name from Bartley Road, which stretches from the end of Braddel Road to Upper Paya Lebar Road, as part of the Outer Ring Road System. There are some condominiums and houses in the area. It is also where the Gurkha Contingent is based. There are many Gurkhas and their families living there in private flats.

Location
Joo Seng is located in mid-northeast Singapore forming part of the central district. It is situated just south of Hougang and borders Serangoon and Upper Aljunied.

Amenities
There are a few amenities for residents living in Joo Seng. There is a Prime Supermarket, several Kopitiam (coffeeshops), a laundromat, a hair salon , a hotel and various general goods stores. Bartley MRT station links Joo Seng with Junction 8, Serangoon Bus Interchange and Serangoon Town Centre.  The nearby Woodleigh MRT station also provides easy access to places such as Punggol, Dhoby Ghaut and Clarke Quay.

Education
There are a few educational institutions in Joo Seng.
 Cedar Primary School
 Cedar Girls' Secondary School
 Bartley Secondary School
 Maris Stella High School

There used to be another school, Elling Primary School, which closed down in the mid-1990s.

See also
 Mount Vernon, Singapore
 Outer Ring Road System
 Bartley MRT station

References

Places in Singapore
North-East Region, Singapore